Christian Alexander Rodríguez Vásquez (born September 12, 1995) is an footballer, who plays as a midfielder. Born in the United States, Rodríguez represents El Salvador internationally.

Career
Rodríguez spent time in with academy's at D.C. United in the United States and FC Groningen in the Netherlands. He also spent time with National Premier Soccer League side Fredericksburg FC in 2015.

Rodríguez signed his first professional contract with El Salvadorean side FAS in 2015. He returned to the United States in January 2018, when he signed for United Soccer League side Tulsa Roughnecks.

References

External links
 

1995 births
Living people
Soccer players from Virginia
Salvadoran footballers
American sportspeople of Salvadoran descent
Citizens of El Salvador through descent
American soccer players
Association football midfielders
C.D. FAS footballers
FC Tulsa players
USL Championship players